The aguayo (possibly from awayu, Aymara for diaper and for a woven blanket to carry things on the back or to cover the back), or also quepina (possibly from Quechua q'ipi bundle) is a rectangular carrying cloth used in traditional communities in the Andes region of Argentina, Bolivia, Chile, Colombia, Ecuador and Peru. Aymara and Quechua people use it to carry small children or various other items in it on their backs. It is similar to a lliklla and sometimes regarded as a synonym.

Gallery

Sources

See also
 Andean textiles
 Indigenous textile art of the Americas
 Poncho
 Rebozo, a similar piece of cloth used in Mexico

Aymara people
Robes and cloaks
Indigenous textile art of the Americas
Textile arts of the Andes
Latin American clothing
Shawls and wraps
Peruvian clothing
Bolivian clothing
Chilean clothing